Kawasaki Heavy Industries Motorcycle & Engine Company (川崎重工業モーターサイクル&エンジンカンパニー) is a division of Kawasaki Heavy Industries that produces motorcycles, ATVs, utility vehicles, jet ski personal watercraft, and general-purpose petrol engines. Before the 2011 fiscal year it was called Consumer Products & Machinery. Its slogan is "Let the good times roll!"

Motorcycles

Kawasaki's Aircraft Company began the development of a motorcycle engine in 1949. The development was completed in 1952 and mass production started in 1953. In 1954, the first complete Kawasaki Motorcycle was produced under the name of Meihatsu, a subsidiary of Kawasaki Aircraft. In 1960, Kawasaki completed construction of a factory dedicated exclusively to motorcycle production and bought Meguro Motorcycles.

All-terrain vehicles and utility vehicles

Kawasaki's first ATV was the three-wheeled KLT200, which debuted in 1981. Its first four-wheel ATV, the Bayou 185, was introduced in 1985 and in 1989, its first model with four-wheel-drive, the Bayou 300 4x4. Today, Kawasaki's ATV line-up includes a wide range of recreational and utility ATVs.

Kawasaki's MULE (Multi-Use Light Equipment) utility vehicle combines an ATV with a pick-up truck. The first MULE was produced in 1988. Kawasaki now calls their utility vehicles "side-by-side" vehicles.

Watercraft

In 1973, Kawasaki introduced a limited production of stand-up models as designed by the recognized inventor of jet skis, Clayton Jacobson II. In 1976, Kawasaki then began mass production of the JS400-A.  JS400s came with 400 cc two-stroke engines and hulls based upon the previous limited release models.  It became the harbinger of the success Jet-Skis would see in the market up through the 1990s.
In 1986 Kawasaki broadened the world of Jet Skis by introducing a two-person model with lean-in "sport" style handling and a 650 cc engine, dubbed the Kawasaki X2. Then in 1989, they introduced their first two-passenger "sit-down" model, the Tandem Sport (TS) with a step-through seating area.

In 2003, Kawasaki celebrated the Jet Ski brand by releasing a special 30th anniversary edition of its current stand-up model, the SX-R, which has seen a revival of interest in stand-up jetskiing.  The X-2 has also been updated, based on the SX-R platform and re-released in Japan.  Kawasaki continues to produce three models of sit-downs, including many four-stroke models.

Jet Ski is the brand name of personal watercraft manufactured by Kawasaki. The name, however, has become a genericized trademark for any type of personal watercraft.

Racing

Kawasaki's traditional racing colour is green. Many Kawasaki racing teams are called Team Green. The "Monster Energy Kawasaki Team Green™" provides a support program developing amateur motocross racers.

Grand Prix, MotoGP 
Kawasaki's first title was with Dave Simmonds in 1969 when they won the 125 cc World Championship. Kawasaki dominated the 250 cc and 350 cc grand prix classes from 1978 to 1982 winning four titles in each category.

With the introduction of the four-stroke engines into MotoGP in 2002, Kawasaki decided to take part in the new MotoGP World Championship. Kawasaki entered the championship in 2003 with 250 cc Grand Prix racer Harald Eckl's Team Eckl.

In 2003, the Kawasaki Racing Team was formed after Kawasaki had developed their new 990cc ZX-RR bike throughout 2002 and raced it in the last three races of the 2002 MotoGP season. The racing activities were managed by Harald Eckl's team based in Germany. It wasn't until 2004 that Kawasaki had two riders - Alex Hofmann and Shinya Nakano, who raced for the entire season. Nakano placed 3rd in Japan that year achieving Kawasaki's first podium finish in MotoGP.

In 2007, Kawasaki split from Harald Eckl because of Eckl's involvement with a competitor's MotoGP activities, which forced Kawasaki to terminate the relationship immediately. Kawasaki formed Kawasaki Motors Racing, a European subsidiary of Kawasaki Heavy Industries responsible for managing the racing activities of the MotoGP team and any other motorcycle racing activities Kawasaki may enter in the future. For the first time since Kawasaki returned to the premier class of motorcycle racing, the team became a complete ‘in house’ factory team.

On January 9, 2009, Kawasaki announced it had decided to "... suspend its MotoGP racing activities from 2009 season onward and reallocate management resources more efficiently". The company stated that it will continue racing activities using mass-produced motorcycles as well as supporting general race oriented consumers.

 Grand Prix motorcycle racing

Superbike 

From 2003 to 2008, only privateer teams like Bertocchi and PSG-1 entered the world championship, with small factory support.

Kawasaki has won several superbike racing championships. The manufacturer has also claimed nine AMA Superbike Championships with riders such as Reg Pridmore, Eddie Lawson, Wayne Rainey, Scott Russell, and Doug Chandler. During the 1990s, they also dominated the Endurance World Championship.

 Superbike World Championship

 AMA Superbike Championship

 Endurance World Championship

Supertwin 
Kawasaki machinery has been pivotal in the development of Supertwin racing. The racing machines are developed from the Kawasaki 650cc parallel twin commuter bike (ER6-n or ER6-f). The machines are then transformed through development into an 85 bhp race bike with top end speeds in excess of 150 mph.

The KMR Kawasaki Racing Team are one of the leading race teams in the category, whose team members include Ryan Farquhar and Jeremy McWilliams.

 Isle of Man TT Supertwin Race

Isle of Man TT 
Kawasaki has enjoyed numerous successes at the Isle of Man TT Races. The marque has notched up a total of 34 victories which include 3 victories in the Sidecar TT.

Motocross 
Riders on Kawasaki motorcycles won races in the British Motocross Championship, Motocross des Nations, AMA Supercross Championship, Sidecarcross and Supermoto.

Championship wins:
 1995 Stefan Everts, FIM Motocross World Championship (250cc)
 29 times the AMA Motocross Championship

See also

 Kawasaki Motors Racing
 List of Kawasaki motorcycles

References

External links

Kawasaki Heavy Industries
 
Motorcycle manufacturers of Japan
Manufacturing companies based in Kobe
Manufacturing companies based in Tokyo

fr:Kawasaki Heavy Industries#Moto